The mottled snapping prawn (Alpheus bidens) is a species of snapping shrimp found in the Indo-West Pacific oceans.

References

External links
Alpheus bidens, LifeDesks: Alpheidae

Alpheidae
Crustaceans of the Indian Ocean
Crustaceans of the Pacific Ocean
Crustaceans described in 1811
Taxa named by Guillaume-Antoine Olivier